"Two Left Feet" is the first single from the North London indie group The Holloways. It debuted at #33 in the UK charts. It has been included in The Holloways' debut album, So, this is Great Britain?. It has been re-released on 24 September 2007 but it was only to chart at #74 that time.

Track listing
 "Two Left Feet"
 "London Town"
 "Sound of the Sunshine"

Other songs on different versions of the single are:

 "Aspirin"
 "Hallelujah I Love Her So"

A limited press of the 7" vinyl single were signed by all members of the band before release

External links
Music Video

2006 singles
The Holloways songs
2006 songs
Song recordings produced by Clive Langer